Hemiandrus is a genus of wētā in the family Anostostomatidae. In New Zealand they are known as ground wētā due to their burrowing lifestyle. Hemiandrus wētā are nocturnal, and reside in these burrows during the day. Ground wētā seal the entrance of their burrow during the day with a soil plug or door so that their burrow is concealed. This genus was originally said to be distributed in Australia and New Zealand, however, with recent molecular genetic methods, this is under debate. Ground wētā adults are smaller than other types of wētā, with the unusual trait of having both long and short ovipositors, depending on the species. The name of this genus is said to come from this trait as hemi- mean half and -andrus means male, as the species where the female has a short ovipositor can sometimes be mistaken for a male. This genus has a diverse diet, depending on the species.

Taxonomy 
The genus Hemiandrus was originally described by Kjell Ander in 1938. 10 undescribed species of this genus are said to be in Australia, however molecular analyses show that the two lineages genetically represent two separate lineages, therefore their Australasian distribution is under debate. Hemiandrus is however the most species rich genus of the New Zealand Anostostomatidae.

Morphology 
The genus Hemiandrus include the smallest wētā species, with adult individual body size no more than 7 millimetres, and weighing less than a gram. The largest Hemiandrus species has a body length of almost 30mm. These wētā have no tympanum, and instead are able to detect sound through their cuticle, which is adaptive for their underground lifestyle. Some species in this genus have unusually short ovipositors for Orthopterans, the species with this morphological trait exhibit maternal care, which is uncommon as it occurs only in five families within the Orthoptera order.

Diet
The diet of these wētā depends on the species, where H. maculifrons is carnivorous, H. maia is omnivorous, eating fruit and invertebrates. Other ground wētā species however have been shown to be mainly herbivorous, eating apricots and various grass species.

Distribution
 Australia (Undescribed species)
 New Zealand - This genus are found throughout the North and South Island, and even on some of the offshore islands of New Zealand. (See distribution map http://wetageta.massey.ac.nz/Text%20files/groundweta.html). They are found in lowland forests, riverbeds, alpine herb fields, and suburban gardens. If this genus also occurs in Australia (which there is debate about), then this is the only non-endemic genus of wētā in New Zealand.

Hemiandrus in New Zealand
There are approximately 14 undescribed New Zealand species of this genus, with 19 described species. These species of Hemiandrus are eaten by native species such as the wattle birds, kiwi, but also by introduced species such as mice, stoats, and hedgehogs. Of the described species in this genus, half have a restricted range, but most are common and widespread, and are not thought to be endangered (as per the New Zealand Department of Conservation).

Species
 Hemiandrus bilobatus Ander, 1938
 Hemiandrus brucei Taylor Smith, Trewick & Morgan-Richards, 2016
 Hemiandrus celaeno Trewick, Taylor-Smith & Morgan-Richards 2020
 Hemiandrus electra Taylor Smith, Morgan-Richards & Trewick, 2013
 Hemiandrus fiordensis (Salmon, 1950)
 Hemiandrus focalis (Hutton, 1897)
Hemiandrus jacinda Trewick, 2021
 Hemiandrus lanceolatus (Walker, 1869)
 Hemiandrus luna Taylor Smith, Trewick & Morgan-Richards, 2016
 Hemiandrus maculifrons (Walker, 1869)
 Hemiandrus maia Taylor Smith, Morgan-Richards & Trewick, 2013
 Hemiandrus merope Trewick, Taylor-Smith & Morgan-Richards 2020
 Hemiandrus nitaweta Jewell, 2007
 Hemiandrus nox Taylor Smith, Trewick & Morgan-Richards, 2016
 Hemiandrus pallitarsis (Walker, 1869)
 Hemiandrus sterope Trewick, Taylor-Smith & Morgan-Richards 2020
 Hemiandrus subantarcticus (Salmon, 1950)
 Hemiandrus superba Jewell, 2007
 Hemiandrus taygete Trewick, Taylor-Smith & Morgan-Richards 2020

Possibly also: 
 Hemiandrus monstrosus Salmon, 1950 (listed as valid in the Orthoptera Species File, as a synonym by other secondary sources)

References

External links
 iNaturalist
 Peripatus
 TerraNature

Weta
Anostostomatidae
Ensifera genera